Oscar John Larson (May 20, 1871 – August 1, 1957) was a U.S. Representative from Minnesota.

Life
Larson was born in a Swedish-speaking family in Uleåborg in the Grand Duchy of Finland (then part of the Russian Empire). He immigrated to the United States in 1876 with his parents, who settled in Calumet, Michigan. He attended the public schools and graduated from the Northern Indiana Normal School (now Valparaiso University) in 1891. He subsequently graduated from the law department of the University of Michigan at Ann Arbor in 1894, was admitted to the bar and commenced practice in Calumet in 1894. He served as the prosecuting attorney for Houghton County from 1899 to 1904. In 1907, he moved to Duluth, Minnesota and continued the practice of law. He was elected as a Republican to the 67th and 68th congresses, (March 4, 1921 – March 3, 1925), opting not to run for re-election in 1924. He resumed the practice of law for many years and died in Duluth on August 1, 1957. He is buried in Forest Hill Cemetery in Ann Arbor, Michigan.

Awards and recognitions
Larson received the Order of the White Rose of Finland (knight) in 1920, and he was promoted to commander in 1933.

References 

American Congregationalists
Valparaiso University alumni
Finnish emigrants to the United States (1809–1917)
1871 births
1957 deaths
University of Michigan Law School alumni
Republican Party members of the United States House of Representatives from Minnesota
People from Oulu